The Vought XSB3U was an American biplane scout bomber developed by Vought-Sikorsky for the United States Navy during the 1930s. Developed as an alternative to the SB2U Vindicator monoplane, the aircraft proved unsatisfactory to the Navy in comparison, and development was not pursued.

Design and development
In late 1934, the U.S. Navy's Bureau of Aeronautics (BuAer) issued a specification for new scout bomber and torpedo bomber designs. Eight companies submitted ten designs in response, evenly split between monoplanes and biplanes.

Exemplifying the Bureau of Aeronautics' reluctance to fully embrace the monoplane configuration for carrier-based aircraft, the XSB3U-1 was proposed as a more conventional alternative to Vought's XSB2U-1, which was designed as a modern monoplane. The XSB3U was modified from the last production SBU Corsair, using essentially the same airframe, including a fully enclosed cockpit, and Pratt & Whitney R-1535 radial engine, but with a more streamlined surface and cowling. In addition, the XSB3U had fully retractable landing gear.

Operational history
The XSB3U-1 was delivered to Naval Air Station Anacostia for evaluation by the U.S. Navy in April 1936;, at the same time as its primary competitor, the XSB2U-1. Comparative testing of the two aircraft during 1936 proved the complete superiority of the monoplane configuration; on the same power, the SB2U-1 was  faster despite being larger and heavier than the biplane. However, the Navy was impressed by the XSB3U's method of landing gear retraction, which provided a more streamlined surface after retraction than most other methods used at the time.

Following the end of the evaluation, the XSB3U was retained by the Navy, and used for experimental and liaison purposes by the Navy, also being used by NACA at Langley Field for testing of tail loads starting in  August 1938, continuing through January 1939 when the aircraft was returned to the Navy, being retired shortly thereafter.

Operators

United States Navy
NACA

Specifications (XSB3U-1)

See also

References
Notes

Citations

Bibliography

External links

 Grumman XSB3U-1 Aviation Enthusiast Corner
 Vought official website

SB03U
1930s United States attack aircraft
Single-engined tractor aircraft
Biplanes
Carrier-based aircraft
Aircraft first flown in 1936